Datuk Haji Yussof bin Haji Mahal (born 1 May 1957) was the Member of the Parliament of Malaysia for the Labuan constituency, representing the United Malays National Organisation (UMNO), a component party of Barisan Nasional (BN) coalition, for one term from 2008 to 2013.

Family 
Yussof is married to Isfahani Ishak and the couple has four children.

Political career 
Yussof was elected to federal Parliament for the Labuan constituency in the 2008 election. He replaced fellow UMNO member Suhaili Abdul Rahman who was dropped by the party following a factional dispute. Yussof himself was replaced as UMNO's candidate for the 2013 election, by Rozman Isli.

Election results

Honours
 :
 Member of the Order of the Defender of the Realm (A.M.N.) (2002)
 :
 Companion Class I of the Exalted Order of Malacca (D.M.S.M.) - Datuk (2004)

References 

Living people
1957 births
People from Sabah
Members of the Dewan Rakyat
United Malays National Organisation politicians
Malaysian Muslims
Members of the Order of the Defender of the Realm